Betty Helen Lucas (31 May 1924 – 7 April 2015), also known as Betty Lucas Peterson, was an Australian character actress and theatre director, known for her numerous roles on stage and television, starting from the post-WWII years in 1945.

Biography
Lucas was born in the Sydney suburb of Coogee, New South Wales to Walter Lucas and Marion Gibson. She trained with May Hollinworth at her Metropolitan Theatre. She moved to London in the early 1950s and appeared in stage roles, returning to Australia in 1965, she featured in TV serials, including played prominent roles in Prisoner as Clara Goddard in 1979, Taurus Rising as Faith Drysdale in 1982, and Richmond Hill as Mavis Roberts in 1988, Her numerous credits in TV roles in guest appearances in serials included Homicide, Division 4, Matlock Police, Certain Women, A Country Practice, The Flying Doctors, Blue Heelers, All Saints, Always Greener. and Packed to the Rafters

Lucas married in 1946 the actor, producer and writer Ralph Peterson, he died in 1996 and their son, Joel Peterson (1954–2017), became a cinematographer.

Filmography

Film

Television

References

External links
 .

1924 births
2015 deaths
Australian film actresses
Australian stage actresses
Australian television actresses
Australian theatre directors
Actresses from New South Wales